The Woods Hole, Martha's Vineyard and Nantucket Steamship Authority, doing business as The Steamship Authority (SSA), is the statutory regulatory body for all ferry operations between mainland Massachusetts and the islands of Martha's Vineyard and Nantucket, as well an operator of ferry services between the mainland and the islands. It is the only ferry operator to carry automobiles to and from the islands. The Authority also operates several freight vessels, thus serving as the main link for shipping any commercial goods that are not transported using the airports on Nantucket or Martha's Vineyard.

History

Early Nantucket service

The Steamship Authority's roots trace back to the 1833-established Nantucket Steamboat Company.

Demand for regular steamship service between Cape Cod and Nantucket increased following the opening of the Cape Cod Railroad's Hyannisport station in 1854. The same year, the company built a terminal near the rail station and renamed itself the Nantucket and Cape Cod Steamboat Company. The company's two vessels, Telegraph and Massachusetts, now began to only serve Hyannis, rather than making the longer trip to Woods Hole and New Bedford. In 1855, the steamships were replaced by the Island Home, the company's first vessel specifically engineered for the Nantucket Sound.

Early Martha's Vineyard service
Following the opening of the Hyannis terminal, the New Bedford, Vineyard and Nantucket Steamboat Company was formed in 1854 to provide service with the Eagle's Wing between the namesake destinations and Woods Hole. When the competing Island Home service began in 1885, though, Eagle's Wing ceased serving Nantucket (as well as New Bedford) due to low ridership.

The railroad station at Woods Hole, which opened in 1872, had a similar effect on steamship demand. Both the railroad and early steamboat services were at one point owned by the New York, New Haven and Hartford Railroad (NYNHH).

20th century consolidation
The NYNHH, realizing financial troubles, sold the ferry services known at the time as the New England Steamship Company to Massachusetts Steamship Lines on December 31, 1945. In 1948, the Commonwealth of Massachusetts announced its intent to consolidate the private ferry services into a state-owned entity. This created the New Bedford, Woods Hole, Martha's Vineyard and Nantucket Steamship Authority, which began in 1949. The Massachusetts legislature dropped "New Bedford" from the company's name in 1960. The last steamship in regular service was the Nobska, which ran the Woods Hole–Nantucket route until 1973.

Several current vessels utilize names that have been a part of Island culture for many years.

Ferry service

Martha's Vineyard
Frequent passenger and auto ferry service is operated to the Martha's Vineyard towns of Vineyard Haven year round, and to Oak Bluffs from Memorial Day to Labor Day from the mainland terminal in Woods Hole, Massachusetts. Sailing time is approximately 45 minutes to both Vineyard Haven and Oak Bluffs.

In early 2001, the SSA purchased the  MV Schamonchi, along with the New Bedford-Martha's Vineyard route. She provided passenger-only service on this route until 2003, generating operating losses of about $800,000 per year. The vessel has since been sold, and a year-round high-speed catamaran service is now operated between New Bedford and Vineyard Haven (and seasonally to Oak Bluffs) by Seastreak.

Nantucket
Year round passenger and auto ferry, as well as freight service is operated to Nantucket from the mainland terminal in Hyannis, Massachusetts. Sailing time to Nantucket takes approximately 2 hours and 15 minutes.

State regulatory body
In addition providing ferry service, the Steamship Authority (hence the name) regulates the many commercial aspects of ferry operations to and from the Islands (those that are not regulated by the US Coast Guard). All scheduled passenger ferry operations carrying over 40 people to and from the Islands must, by law, be approved by the Steamship Authority. This generally precludes any ferry service that would directly compete with the Steamship Authority, essentially giving it a legal monopoly on all auto ferry service to the Islands.

However, approval has been granted to other companies to operate smaller passenger ferry operations to the islands, including Freedom Cruises (Harwich Port to Nantucket), Seastreak (New Bedford to Oak Bluffs and Nantucket), Rhode Island Fast Ferry (North Kingstown, Rhode Island to Oak Bluffs, the Pied Piper Edgartown Ferry (Falmouth to Edgartown).

Services established prior to May 1973, which include Hy-Line Cruises (Hyannis, Nantucket, and Oak Bluffs) and the Island Queen (Falmouth to Oak Bluffs), are allowed to provide certain services as grandfathered carriers due to their existence prior to current regulations. However, any additional new services must be licensed by the Authority.

Governance
The Steamship Authority is governed by a five-person board composed of one resident from Nantucket, Martha's Vineyard, Falmouth, Barnstable, and New Bedford, with each resident confirmed by the appropriate local government entity. The board's current chair is James Malkin of Martha's Vineyard.

The authority also has an advisory board known as the Port Council, composed of one resident from Barnstable, Fairhaven, Falmouth, Nantucket, New Bedford, Oak Bluffs, and Tisbury. The current chair of this board is Edward Anthes-Washburn of New Bedford.

Fleet
The Steamship Authority currently operates ten vessels. Six passenger ferries are predominantly used for transporting passengers and personal cargo, five of which also accept cars and trucks. The remaining four ferries are open-top and primarily used for larger trucks and freight, although ordinary passengers and automobiles are usually allowed, space permitting.

Vessels are maintained at a facility on South Street in Fairhaven, Massachusetts.

Historic fleet
This list includes earlier vessels that were operated by private companies, many of which were incorporated into the modern Steamship Authority.

Accidents and incidents
In 2007, it was reported that Steamship Authority and Hy-Line ferries were dumping sewage into Nantucket Sound. The authority later announced it would pump sewage off ferries at its terminals, which it did so beginning in 2011.

During the first four months of 2018, 549 ferry trips were cancelled between Martha's Vineyard and Falmouth due to mechanical problems on the ferry boats. The majority of the mechanical problems occurred on the Woods Hole-Vineyard Haven route. The rate of cancellations in 2018 was approximately 15 times the yearly average of breakdowns and cancellations. A private consultant brought in to find the underlying cause behind the cancellations found mismanagement with "penny wise, pound foolish" investments and competing factions within the organization.

On the night of June 16, 2017, Iyanough crashed into a jetty in Hyannis harbor, injuring fifteen of the fifty-seven people aboard.

The Steamship Authority was the victim of a ransomware attack on June 2, 2021, which affected the ticketing and reservation system. The Steamship Authority did not pay a ransom, and the website was operational again by June 12.

References

Further reading

External links
 

1833 establishments in Massachusetts
Companies based in Massachusetts
Ferry companies of Massachusetts
Transport companies established in 1833
Martha's Vineyard
Steamboats of Nantucket Sound
Transportation in Dukes County, Massachusetts
Transportation in Nantucket, Massachusetts